Antero is a Finnish given name and the Spanish version of the Latin name Anterus. It may refer to:

 Antero Abreu (1927–2017), Angolan author and poet
 Antero Alli (1952–), Finnish astrologer
 Ántero Asto, Peruvian politician
 Antero de Quental (1842–1891), Portuguese poet
 Antero Flores Aráoz (1942–), Peruvian lawyer and politician
 Antero González (1901–1978), Spanish footballer
 Antero Halonen (1938–), Finnish boxer
 Antero Kivelä (1955–), Finnish ice hockey goaltender
 Antero Kivi (1904–1981), Finnish discus thrower
 Antero Lehtonen (1954–), Finnish ice hockey player
 Antero Leitzinger (1962–), Finnish political historian
 Antero Manninen (1973–), Finnish musician
 Antero Mertaranta (1956–), Finnish sportscaster
 Antero Mongrut, Peruvian runner who competed in the 1948 Summer Olympics
 Antero Niittymäki (1980–), professional ice hockey goaltender
 Antero Paljakka (1969–), Finnish shot put player
 Antero Rubín (1851–1923), Spanish general and politician
 Antero Soriano (1888–1929), Philippine senator
 Antero Sotamaa (1940–), Finnish sailor who competed in the 1972 Summer Olympics
 Antero Svensson (1892–1946), Finnish major general
 Antero Vartia (1982–), Finnish politician
 Antero Väyrynen (1916–1970), Finnish politician
 Antero Vipunen, in Finnish mythology, giant
 Gabriel Antero (1980–), Colombian footballer

See also 
 
 Anterograde amnesia, form of amnesia in which the victim cannot create new memories
 Anterograde tracing, research method in the field of neuroscience
 Anterolateral ligament, ligament on the human knee
 Antero Junction, Colorado, ghost town
 Antero Reservoir, reservoir in Colorado
 Antero Resources, an exploration and production company headquartered in Denver, Colorado
 Antero Rokka, a fictional character from the 1954 war novel The Unknown Soldier by Väinö Linna
 Antero Soriano Highway, highway in the Philippines named after the former senator
 Anteros, in Greek mythology, the god of requited love
 Eros/Anteros, the second studio album by Belgian band Oathbreaker
 Mount Antero, mountain in Chaffee County, Colorado named after Chief Antero of the Uintah band of the Ute people
 San Antero, town in Colombia

References 

Finnish masculine given names
Spanish masculine given names